Cazenovia is an unincorporated community in Cazenovia Township, Woodford County, Illinois, United States.

References

Unincorporated communities in Woodford County, Illinois
Unincorporated communities in Illinois